was a village located in Higashichikuma District, Nagano Prefecture, Japan.

As of 2003, the village had an estimated population of 5,917 and a density of 65.56 persons per km². The total area was 90.25 km².

On April 1, 2005, Shiga, along with the villages of Azumi, Azusagawa and Nagawa (all from Minamiazumi District), was merged into the expanded city of Matsumoto.

Dissolved municipalities of Nagano Prefecture
Matsumoto, Nagano